Adrasmon is a town and a jamoat in northern Tajikistan. It is part of the city of Guliston, and lies in the extreme north-east of Sughd Region, about 60 km north-east of Guliston. The jamoat consists of the town Adrasmon and 3 villages: Guldara, Gulshan and Zarchasma.

References

External links
Satellite map at Maplandia.com
Adrasman.ru: web site

Populated places in Sughd Region